Trondheim Spektrum (formerly Nidarøhallen) is a multi-purpose indoor arena in Trondheim, Norway. It is located on the peninsula of Øya next to the Nidelven river. It is the home arena for women's handball team Byåsen HE. A new arena was completed in 2019 and replaced the largest multi-use hall in the same location. The eight former halls originally went by the name Nidarøhallen.

Next to the halls is the athletics facility Øya stadion and the Trondhjems Tennis Club (TTK) with four outdoor clay courts and indoor tennis hall.

History

Old building

The original halls were built in three stages. Halls A and B were designed by architects Pran & Torgersen and were opened in 1963. Further halls was added in 1971 (hall C) and 1980 (hall G), this was followed by stage 3 (halls D and E/H) in 1988 which was designed by Lien & Risan architectural office. The eighth (hall F) was added in 2000. to Old Trondheim Spectrum had a floor area of 15,000 m² spread over eight multi-use halls. The main hall had 3,400 seats and space for around 4,500 people standing.

Trondheim Spektrum also had 1,000 square meters of meeting rooms in different sizes from 80 to 480 square meters. The facility had its own press center which consisted of two study rooms, three offices and a meeting room. A tennis club, with four outdoor courts, and a catering company also had premises within the complex.

New modern building

From summer 2017, Trondheim Spektrum underwent a significant renovation and extension. In June 2017, Veidekke Entreprenør won the contract valued at NOK 317 million (excluding VAT) to build the new multi-purpose hall. Construction work started in September 2017 and was completed in the autumn of 2019. The new venue has nine full-size handball courts and six children's mini courts. The main hall has 8,600 seats and concerts can be arranged with up to 12,000 spectators.

In June 2019, Eventim Noway was announced as the official ticketing partner. The venue opened on 4 October 2019 with a performance by John Mayer during the European leg of his 2019 concert tour, I Guess I Just Feel Like World Tour.

Events
Besides sports and concerts, the halls are regularly used for courses, seminars, congresses and trade fairs; for example, the fish farming fair  and the fishing fair .

Sport
Trondheim Spektrum will be one of the arenas where matches will be played in the preliminary rounds of the European Handball Championship in 2020 for both the men and women tournaments. Previously, matches during the IHF World Women's Handball Championship have also been held here in both 1993 and 1999, and during the 2008 European Men's Handball Championship. It will host the 2025 World Men's Handball Championship with the country, Croatia and Denmark.

Other sporting events to be held here include the Møbelringen Cup (in 2005 and 2009) and the 2016 Northern European Gymnastics Championships.

Music and concerts
On 15 February 2020, the final of Melodi Grand Prix 2020 took place. This was the first time that Trondheim hosted a Melodi Grand Prix final, and marked the first time since Melodi Grand Prix 1989 that the final was not arranged in Oslo.

Transport

To get to the Arena, Line 12 trafficates the bus stop Nidarø right beside one of the entrances. Other ways may include taking the Metrobus (Line 3) or Line 11, 75, 21, 28 and 26 to Skansen and walking over the Bridge connecting the two parts. Trondheim Airport is 37 km away while Trondheim Central Station is less than five kilometers away.

See also
List of indoor arenas in Norway
List of indoor arenas in Nordic countries

References

External links

 
 

Buildings and structures in Trondheim
Sports venues in Trondheim
Handball venues in Norway
Indoor arenas in Norway
Convention centres in Norway
Music venues in Norway
Music venues completed in 1963
1963 establishments in Norway
Sports venues completed in 1963